Nicolas Huet (born 22 July 1976) is a French snowboarder who competed in parallel giant slalom at the 2002 Winter Olympics, where he placed 4th, and 2006 Winter Olympics, where he placed 10th. He was born in Nice, France.

Huet also competed at the World Snowboard Championships from 1999 through 2005:

References

External links
 

1976 births
Living people
Snowboarders at the 2002 Winter Olympics
Snowboarders at the 2006 Winter Olympics
Olympic snowboarders of France
French male snowboarders
21st-century French people